Thousand Islands Secondary School (TISS) is a public high school in the city of Brockville, Ontario and one of the most populous high school managed by the Upper Canada District School Board. Built in 1965, the school has been a part of the Brockville community for over 50 years

TISS has an enrollment of approximately 900 students and offers a wide range of programs. The school offers a full complement of academic, technical and arts courses in addition to skilled trades programs and many Specialist High Skills Major (SHSM) programs. The school also has many other unique programs such as Integrated Math/Science and Technology (MST), an online education program, and the International Studies Program which allows students each year to travel to locations such as Nicaragua, Germany, Greece, and Italy.

Teachers 

The school has over 50 teachers.  Many have been acknowledged for teaching excellence at the local Board and provincial level.  The school is also part of a unique partnership with Queen's University as an associate school and trains dozens of teacher candidates every year.

The school also has several clubs that operate annually, amphitheatre, 3 gyms, and an 8-lane Mondo track and field complex.

Athletics program 

The athletics program at TISS is arguably the best in Eastern Ontario and one of the best in the country. The school has captured an incredible 110 EOSSAA championships and over a dozen OFSAA championship banners, 7 in the last 3 years alone. Several past TISS Pirates have represented Canada in track and field, basketball, football, and cross country.

TISS held the 2012 OFSAA track and field event at their facility.

Track and field/cross country 

The track and field/cross country program at the school is one of the most known facets of Brockville and is known across Canada. The team has won 11 OFSAA team titles since 2002, captured over 50 individual OFSAA medals, and seen over 20 of their athletes to NCAA schools on full athletic scholarships. In 2004 the school sent a record setting 6 track stars to the U.S. on NCAA track scholarships. The scholarships totaled over $275,000 (USD) combined. It saw the athletes to schools in New York, Tennessee, Louisiana, and North Carolina.  To this day no other school in Ontario has produced more scholarships in one year than the Pirates. Thousand Islands Secondary School hosted the OFSAA track and field meet in June 2012, it is one of the biggest track and field meets in North America.

Girls basketball 

The girls basketball program has captured three OFSAA championships, and has won the EOSSAA title 7 of the past 12 years. Stacey Dales (WNBA, Canadian Women's Olympic Basketball Team), and Kendra Walker-Roche (Fresno State, NCAA) are just 2 of the many post-secondary players who developed their skills at TISS. . The football and soccer programs have also achieved great success with several alumni suiting up for professional teams (Burke Dales of the Pittsburgh Steelers and Calgary Stampeders and Troy Cunningham of the B.C. Lions) and has created a reputation throughout Ontario and Canada as one of the best high school sports programs.

The school finished construction of a $1,500,000 track and field and athletic complex with funding from the Friends of TISS Committee. Many prominent Brockville families contributed to the project.

See also
List of high schools in Ontario

References

High schools in Leeds and Grenville United Counties
Education in Brockville
Educational institutions established in 1965
1965 establishments in Ontario